Adelaide L. Fischer Federlein (born September 1889 – died after April 1950) was an American soprano singer, based in New York.

Early life 
Fischer was from Brooklyn, the daughter of Otto Fischer and Adelaide Freitag Fischer. Her brother, Otto L. Fischer, was a pianist, educator, composer who was based in Wichita, Kansas in adulthood.

Career 
Fischer, "a charming light soprano", sang in recitals and churches, mostly in the mid-1910s and 1920s, including appearances at New York's Aeolian Hall. In 1915, she joined Florence Hinkle and Inez Barbour Hadley as soprano soloists in a performance of a Mahler's Eighth Symphony with the Philadelphia Orchestra, conducted by Leopold Stokowski. She toured in the southern United States in 1918. During World War I she sang for the troops and gave benefit concerts, accompanied by her husband. In 1921, she gave a joint recital with Mario Laurenti at the Brooklyn Academy of Music.

Fischer made a number of recordings in 1914 and 1917, mostly for the Edison label. Linn Seiler and Karl Ino dedicated a song, "Butterflies" (1916), to Fischer.

She was a church soloist and taught music later in her life, in New York City.

Personal life 
Fischer married organist and composer Gottfried Harrison Federlein in 1918. They had a daughter, Norma Adelaide, born in 1919; they divorced in the 1920s, and he remarried. She lived with her brother in Brooklyn in her later years, and survived him when he died in 1950.

References 

1889 births

20th-century deaths
Year of death unknown
People from Brooklyn
American sopranos